Dharma Sri Munasinghe (March 1, 1930 – August 30, 2004) was a Sinhala radio playwright and film screenwriter and director, best known for his work as the writer of the famous Sinhala radio plays Muvan palessa and Monara thenna. He was also an award-winning Sinhala drama actor, and featured in the play Maname.

Early life and career
Dharma Sri Munasinghe was born on 1 March 1930 in Kandy Udawella village near Danture. He was educated at Dharmaraja College, Kandy where he excelled in studies, and was selected to the University of Ceylon. But Dharma Sri had other plans, as he turned down University entrance, and moved to Colombo in search of employment.

He joined the Sri Lanka Broadcasting Corporation, then the Radio Ceylon, in 1952 as a clerk. Young Dharma Sri had the fortune of working with many contemporary greats of Sinhala broadcasting  at Radio Ceylon such as Thevis Guruge, D.M. Colombage, H.M.Gunasekera,  P. Velikala and Praba Perera. It was an important period of his life, as Dharma Sri was inspired by these great personalities.

He left the Radio Ceylon in 1956 to pursue a career in the Inland Revenue Department. But he continued writing Radio plays and working as an announcer for SLBC, and even appeared in the famous radio Comedy show Vinoda samaya with comedians Annesley Dias and Berty Gunathilake. Dharma Sri is the writer of 23 Radio play series in total.

Dharma Sri Munasinghe excelled in many disciplines of popular art. He was a brilliant  Sinhala Radio Play writer; a Radio dramatist, announcer, comedian, producer and actor; an award-winning Theatre actor; a Tele drama screenwriter and actor; an award-winning Film actor, screenwriter & director; and an Oriental dancer.

Family
He was married to Mrs. Silwari Perera(Manel) and was the father of two sons and three daughters. Dharma Sri Munasinghe died on 28 August 2004, at the age of 74. He was a rare artiste who displayed equal celebrity in different spheres of arts, and it's inevitable for Sri Lanka to feel the absence of an artiste like Dharma Sri Munasinghe.

Awards
 Winner of the award for Best Actor in 1965, for the stage play Daruduka
 Winner of the award for Most Creative Acting, for the film Hulawaali
 Won an award for his acting in Bahubootha kolama, which is a preface to the drama Maname

Works

Radio plays
 Monarathenna - This was the first Sinhala radio play series by a single writer
 Muvan pelessa – This drama was aired for over 40 years (co-writer)
 Gajamuthu
 Guwanviduli rangamadala
 Adaraneeya Julius (1971) – This was the first Sri Lankan detective radio play and was banned
 Mudali mankada – This was based on his research and was banned in Sri Lanka
 Mee messo
 He translated numerous foreign short stories & novels, and adopted as Radio plays
 Joined Annesley Dias & Berty Gunathilake for the famous comedy show Vinoda samaya
 He’s the writer of 23 Radio play series.
 He was a producer, announcer & actor of  Lama pitiya, Grameeya sandyawa and Guvanviduli rangamadala

Theatre
 Ediriweera Sarachchandra’s Maname (1958–59)

Tele Drama
 Dimuthu muthu – Screenwriter and Actor
 Screenwriter of  seven Teledramas

Films
 Muvan pelessa - Screenwriter and Director of two sequels
 Monarathenna - Screenwriter and Director of four episodes

See also
Radio Ceylon
Sri Lanka Broadcasting Corporation
Sri Lankan literature
List of Sri Lankan Broadcasters

References 

Sri Lankan radio writers
Sri Lankan radio personalities
Sri Lankan screenwriters
Alumni of Dharmaraja College
1930 births
2004 deaths
People from Kandy
20th-century screenwriters